On July 22, 2022, three members of the Schmidt family were murdered in Maquoketa Caves State Park. The assailant, identified as 23-year-old Anthony Orlando Sherwin, later committed suicide by gunshot.

Murders 
Shortly before 6:23 a.m. on July 22, 2022, an assailant murdered three members of the Schmidt family. The father Tyler, 42, was shot multiple times and stabbed to death and the mother Sarah, 42, was stabbed multiple times until she died. The couple's daughter, six-year-old Lula, died from a gunshot wound and strangulation. The couple's nine-year-old son Arlo was the sole survivor of the attack. 

Authorities received a phone call notifying them of the triple homicide at about 6:23 a.m. After arriving at the scene and discovering the victims, they temporarily closed the park to investigate. After evacuating the campgrounds, police learned that the only registered camper that was unaccounted for was Anthony Orlando Sherwin, 23, a resident from La Vista, Nebraska. At the time, they did not know whether he was the perpetrator or another victim, but did know that he was armed. 

At 11:00 a.m., Sherwin's body was found by a plane used by law enforcement to search for him. Sherwin had died from a self-inflicted gunshot wound west of the campground and was shortly identified by law enforcement as a suspect in the case.

Investigation 
The motive for the shooting is still unknown. There is no known connection between the Schmidt family and Sherwin, and authorities believe that the shooting was a random attack.

On August 4, the Iowa Department of Public Safety released the autopsy reports. The causes of death include a combination of gunshot wounds, multiple sharp force injuries, and strangulation. The report concluded, "However, the known facts and circumstances, and all evidence collected to this point, substantiate Sherwin was the perpetrator of the homicides and acted alone.""

Aftermath 
Camp Shalom, a Christian summer camp about a mile and a half away from where the shooting took place, was safely evacuated at 9:15 a.m.

Reactions 
Shortly after the incident, the surviving parents of the alleged shooter disputed the allegations against their son, who had no criminal record. “We think (Anthony) might have sensed trouble and grabbed the gun for safety,” Cecilia Sherwin said. “We refuse to believe the news. We are deeply saddened as he had so much to live for and gave us no indication that anything was wrong.” A young boy ran up to the Sherwins’ campsite yelling for help and told her that a man wearing black had shot his family, she said. Cecilia Sherwin said her son was wearing green, not black, and no black clothing was found in the area.

Kim Reynolds, the governor of Iowa, made a statement about the shooting, saying “I’m horrified by the shooting this morning at Maquoketa Caves State Park and devastated by the loss of three innocent lives. As we grieve this unimaginable tragedy, Kevin and I pray for the victims’ family members and the law enforcement officers who responded to the scene. We ask Iowans to do the same.” Representatives Ashley Hinson, Cheri Bustos, and Senator Chuck Grassley made similar statements.

References

2022 in Iowa
2022 murders in the United States
Crimes in Iowa
Deaths by firearm in Iowa
Family murders
July 2022 crimes in the United States
Murder–suicides in Iowa
Suicides by firearm in Iowa